The Bayer designation Rho Arae (ρ Ara / ρ Arae) is shared by two star systems, in the constellation Ara:

 ρ¹ Arae
 ρ² Arae

Arae, Rho
Ara (constellation)